Skin: The Remixes is the first remix album by Australian electronic musician Flume, released on 7 April 2017, by Future Classic. It contains various remixes and re-recordings of selections from Flume's second studio album Skin (2016).

Background and release 
Flume released his second studio album Skin in May 2016. The lead single "Never Be like You" was certified 5× Platinum and was the fourth highest-selling single in Australia and New Zealand in 2016. It was also ranked number one on the Triple J Hottest 100, 2016. The album's third single, "Say It" was certified 3× Platinum and was the twentieth highest-selling single in Australia in 2016. The album won eight ARIA Music Awards at the ARIA Music Awards of 2016, three APRA Awards at the APRA Music Awards of 2017 and one Grammy Award for Best Dance/Electronic Album at the 2017 Grammy Awards.

Track listing

References

2017 remix albums
Flume (musician) remix albums
Albums produced by Flume (musician)